Lawrence Cyril Gura (born November 26, 1947) is a left-handed former pitcher in Major League Baseball from  to . He won a national championship at  Arizona State University and spent 16 years in the Major Leagues. He played for the Chicago Cubs (1970–1973, 1985) of the National League, and the New York Yankees (1974–1975) and Kansas City Royals (1976–1985), both of the American League. He attended Joliet East High School and was inducted into the inaugural Joliet Hall of Fame in Joliet, Illinois.

He was elected to the American League All-Star team in 1980 when he had his finest season, finishing with an 18–10 record and a 2.95 ERA. Gura won in double figures for seven consecutive seasons for the Royals (1978–1984) compiling 99 wins over that span. He particularly pestered his former team, the Yankees, against whom he went 11–6 in the regular season as a Royal. Gura was 3–0 against them in both 1979 and 1980, with five complete games, and tossed another complete-game victory against the Yankees in the 1980 American League Championship Series.

Gura was named Royals pitcher of the year two times.

Gura was the Royals' starting pitcher for Games 2 and 5 of the 1980 World Series.

He finished with a 126–97 career record, 24 saves and an earned run average of 3.76. Gura was also an exceptional fielding pitcher, committing only 7 errors in 483 total chances for a career .986 fielding percentage.

He won 18 games in a season twice including the 1980 season. He ranks in the Royals all time top 10 in games started (219), innings pitched (1,701.1) and though not a dominant strikeout artist, he still struck out 633 batters in a Royal uniform.

Highlights
led the American Association with a .733 winning percentage while playing for the Wichita Aeros in 1972
led the International League with a 2.14 ERA while playing for the Syracuse Chiefs in 1974
led the American League in batters faced (1,175) in 1980
Was named AL Pitcher of the Month for the months of July 1980 and September 1981.

External links
Baseball Reference
Retrosheet

1947 births
Living people
All-American college baseball players
American League All-Stars
Arizona Instructional League Cubs players
Arizona State Sun Devils baseball players
Baseball players from Illinois
Chicago Cubs players
Iowa Cubs players
Kansas City Royals players
Major League Baseball pitchers
New York Yankees players
Spokane Indians players
Sportspeople from Joliet, Illinois
Syracuse Chiefs players
Tacoma Cubs players
Tiburones de La Guaira players
American expatriate baseball players in Venezuela
Wichita Aeros players